Professor Stephen Timothy Hyde is an Australian scientist who was appointed Fellow of the Australian Academy of Science in 2005.

He is professor and also the ARC Federation Fellow in the Department of Applied Mathematics, Research School of Physics, at the Australian National University. He holds the Barry Ninham Chair of Natural Sciences.

His speciality is in the field of theoretical physics: self-assembly of complex materials and systems.

From 1999 to 2002 he was Head of the Department of Applied Mathematics.

References

Fellows of the Australian Academy of Science
Living people
Academic staff of the Australian National University
Australian physicists
Theoretical physicists
Place of birth missing (living people)
Year of birth missing (living people)